

Strains 
Innocuous:
 
Laboratory:
 E. coli K-12, one of two laboratory strains (innocuous)
 Clifton wild type (!)
 
 W3110
 DH5α
 Dam dcm strain
 HB101
 Escherichia coli B, the other of the two lab strains from which all lab substrains originate
 Escherichia coli BL21(DE3)
Pathogenic:
 Enterotoxigenic E. coli (ETEC)
 Enteropathogenic E. coli (EPEC)
 Enteroinvasive E. coli (EIEC)
 Enterohemorrhagic E. coli (EHEC)
 Enteroaggregative E. coli (EAEC)
 Uropathogenic E. coli (UPEC)
 Verotoxin-producing E. coli
 E. coli O157:H7 is an enterohemorrhagic strain also 2006 North American E. coli outbreak
 E. coli O104:H4, also 2011 E. coli O104:H4 outbreak
 Escherichia coli O121
 Escherichia coli O104:H21
 Escherichia coli K1, meningitis
 Adherent Invasive Escherichia coli (AIEC), morbus Crohn
 Escherichia coli NC101
 Shigella
 Shigella flexneri
 Shigella dysenteriae
 Shigella boydii
 Shigella sonnei

References 

Enterobacteria
Escherichia coli
Gram-negative bacteria